Nematopogon dorsigutellus is a moth of the Adelidae family or fairy longhorn moths. It was described by Nikolay Grigoryevich Erschoff in 1877. It is found from Siberia to Japan, Korea and northern China.

References

Moths described in 1877
Adelidae
Moths of Japan
Moths of Asia